Interfaith Officiants are trained in world religions and inter-spirituality and can help people in identifying their own spiritual beliefs through a process of spiritual self-discovery.  

Interfaith Officiants come from many different faith backgrounds and have different philosophies and personal theologies, yet are well-versed in a multitude of religious traditions. They share a commitment to serving individuals, couples and families in a very personal and respectful way, building ceremonies around the wishes, preferences, beliefs and practices of the clients they serve.  Like hospital chaplains, Interfaith Officiants generally do not proselytize on behalf of any one faith tradition, but respect and honor them all.

A number of Interfaith Seminaries and religious institutions train Interfaith Officiants, which are also sometimes called Interfaith Ministers or Interfaith Celebrants.  Interfaith Officiants differ from Chaplains in that they usually work independently and serve the public at large, as opposed to Chaplains, who are employed by the military, hospitals, or other institutions.

In 2010, the Council of Interfaith Communities of the United States was created, which is an umbrella for interfaith-interspiritual ministers who are going beyond celebrant status to engage and organize their couples in a lifetime community ministry to support interfaith families.  The services of the minister include all of the life celebrations found in traditional faith organizations.  The CIC-USA includes most of the first interfaith seminaries in the world including: The New Seminary (New York), One Spirit Interfaith Seminary (New York), Chaplaincy Institute for Arts and Interfaith Ministry (Berkeley, CA), Chaplaincy Institute of Maine (Maine), the American Institute for Holistic Theology (Alabama), and the Interfaith Academy for Interfaith Studies (Texas and Mexico), and the All-Paths Divinity School (Los Angeles, CA).

References

Sources
  UK Interfaith Officiants
 Video: Interfaith Weddings and Interspirituality 
  Council of Interfaith Communities of the United States

Clergy
Interfaith marriage